Nazareth is a city in Israel, described in the New Testament as the childhood home of Jesus.

Nazareth may also refer to:

Places and jurisdictions

Africa 
 Nazareth, Ethiopia, now Adama
 Nazareth, Lesotho

Asia 
 Nazareth, Tamil Nadu, India
 Roman Catholic Archbishopric of Nazareth, a former residential metropolitan see, and successor Latin and a Maronite titular sees

Europe 
 Nazareth, Belgium
 Nazareth in Barletta, Italy, home of the Archbishops of Nazareth in exile from 1327

North America 
 Nazareth, Kentucky, United States
 Nazareth, Pennsylvania, United States
 Nazareth Historic District
 Lower Nazareth Township, Northampton County, Pennsylvania
 Upper Nazareth Township, Northampton County, Pennsylvania
 Nazareth, Texas, United States
 Nazareth, U.S. Virgin Islands

South America
 Nazareth (Asunción), Paraguay

Oceania 
 Nazareth, Pentecost Island, Vanuatu

South America 
 Nazareth, Peru

People 
 Annette Nazareth (born 1956), an American attorney
 Daniel Nazareth (1948–2014), Indian composer and conductor
 Ernesto Nazareth (1863–1934), Brazilian composer and pianist
 H. O. Nazareth, British film maker, journalist and barrister
 Marco Antonio Nazareth (1986–2009), Mexican boxer
 Oswald Bruno Nazareth (died 1998), Pakistani teacher
 Peter Nazareth (born 1940), Ugandan writer

Other uses
 Nazareth (band), a Scottish rock band
 Nazareth (album), 1971
 Nazareth Speedway, a former auto racing facility near Nazareth, Pennsylvania, U.S.
 Nazareth Bank, a large submerged bank in the Indian Ocean
 "Nazareth", short for Jésus de Nazareth (song) by Charles Gounod

See also

 Nazaré (disambiguation)
 Nazareth Academy (disambiguation)
 Nazareth College (disambiguation)
 Nazaret (name), a variant of Nazareth in many languages
 Beatrice of Nazareth (c. 1200 – 1268), a Flemish Cistercian nun
 Sisters of Nazareth, Roman Catholic religious sisters who live in Nazareth Houses